The Bangkok Airways Open was an Asian Tour golf tournament played in Thailand from 2005 to 2008. In 2008 the prize fund was US$300,000, which is one of the smaller purses on the tour.

Winners

External links
Coverage on the Asian Tour's official site

Golf tournaments in Thailand
Former Asian Tour events
Recurring sporting events established in 2005
Recurring sporting events disestablished in 2008
2005 establishments in Thailand
2008 disestablishments in Thailand
Defunct sports competitions in Thailand